Lara Pitt (born 11 November 1981) is an Australian television presenter and sports journalist, mainly known for reporting for Fox Sports on their NRL coverage and Monday Night with Matty Johns.

Early life
Pitt completed a Bachelor of Commerce Marketing & Tourism Management degree at the University of New South Wales and a Business Diploma in Event Management at University of Technology Sydney.
Following these undergraduate degrees Pitt also completed a post-graduate Diploma in Journalism whilst working full-time.

Career
Pitt began her career at Fox in 2006, and joined Fox Sports News in 2007. Pitt was a regular contributor to Fox Sports A-League coverage in 2010 as a reporter.

During her time on Fox, Pitt worked on NRL Super Saturday, NRL Tonight and Monday Night with Matty Johns.  Currently, she is on the weekly League Life panel, is a part of Fox League's weekly podcast, along with Matthew Russell and Warren Smith and relieves on the Sunday Ticket.  Lara is also occasionally a sideline reporter during matches.

Personal life
Lara Pitt is married to Anthony Pitt and they have two sons together named Lachlan and Cooper.
Pitt's nephew is Josh Kemeny who plays for the Melbourne Rebels.

References

External links

Living people
Australian soccer commentators
Australian rugby league commentators
Australian television presenters
Australian women television presenters
Fox Sports (Australian TV network) people
People from Sydney
University of New South Wales alumni
University of Technology Sydney alumni
1981 births